Brachionopus is a genus of South African tarantulas that was first described by Reginald Innes Pocock in 1897. It was transferred to the Theraphosidae from the Barychelidae in 1985.

Species
 it contains 4 species, found in South Africa:
Brachionopus annulatus Purcell, 1903 – South Africa
Brachionopus pretoriae Purcell, 1904 – South Africa
Brachionopus robustus Pocock, 1897 (type) – South Africa
Brachionopus tristis Purcell, 1903 – South Africa

See also
 List of Theraphosidae species

References

Endemic fauna of South Africa
Theraphosidae genera
Spiders of South Africa
Taxa named by R. I. Pocock
Theraphosidae